Krivusha is a rural locality (a khutor) in Kletskoye Rural Settlement, Sredneakhtubinsky District, Volgograd Oblast, Russia. The population was 128 as of 2010. There are 7 streets.

Geography 
Krivusha is located near the River, 38 km southwest of Srednyaya Akhtuba (the district's administrative centre) by road. Plamenka is the nearest rural locality.

References 

Rural localities in Sredneakhtubinsky District